The Men's synchronized 3 metre springboard competition of the diving events at the 2015 World Aquatics Championships was held on 28 July 2015.

Results
The preliminary round was held at 10:00. The final was held at 19:30.

Green denotes finalists

References

Men's synchronized 3 metre springboard